
Gmina Serock is an urban-rural gmina (administrative district) in Legionowo County, Masovian Voivodeship, in east-central Poland.

Villages
Apart from the town of Serock, Gmina Serock contains the villages and settlements of Bolesławowo, Borowa Góra, Cupel, Dębe, Dębinki, Dosin, Gąsiorowo, Guty, Izbica, Jachranka, Jadwisin, Kania Nowa, Kania Polska, Karolino, Łacha, Ludwinowo Dębskie, Ludwinowo Zegrzyńskie, Marynino, Nowa Wieś, Skubianka, Stanisławowo, Stasi Las, Święcienica, Szadki, Wierzbica, Wola Kiełpińska, Wola Smolana, Zabłocie, Zalesie Borowe, Zegrze and Zegrzynek.

Neighbouring gminas
Gmina Serock is bordered by the gminas of Nasielsk, Nieporęt, Pokrzywnica, Pomiechówek, Radzymin, Somianka, Wieliszew, Winnica and Zatory.

References

Polish official population figures 2006

Serock
Legionowo County